Yuan Qiqi (Chinese: 袁琦琦; born 26 October 1995 in Zhangjiagang, Jiangsu province) is a Chinese athlete who specialises in the sprinting events. She won the silver medal at the 2016 Asian Indoor Championships.

Competition record

Personal bests
Outdoor
100 metres – 11.51 (+1.0 m/s, Zhaoqing 2014)
200 metres – 23.71 (+0.9 m/s, Shenyang 2013)
Indoor
60 metres – 7.30 (Xianlin 2015)

References

1995 births
Living people
Chinese female sprinters
Athletes (track and field) at the 2014 Asian Games
Athletes (track and field) at the 2018 Asian Games
Athletes (track and field) at the 2016 Summer Olympics
Olympic athletes of China
Asian Games medalists in athletics (track and field)
Asian Games silver medalists for China
Medalists at the 2018 Asian Games
Sportspeople from Suzhou
Runners from Jiangsu
Olympic female sprinters
21st-century Chinese women